The 2019–20 Texas Tech Red Raiders basketball team represented Texas Tech University in the 2019–20 NCAA Division I men's basketball season as a member of the Big 12 Conference. The Red Raiders were led by fourth-year coach Chris Beard. They played their home games at the United Supermarkets Arena in Lubbock, Texas.

Previous season
They finished the season 31–7, 14–4 in Big 12 play to win the Big 12 regular season title with Kansas State. They lost in the quarterfinals of the Big 12 tournament to West Virginia. They received an at-large bid to the NCAA tournament where they defeated Stephen F. Austin, Buffalo, Michigan and Gonzaga to advance to their first Final Four in school history. In the Final Four they defeated Michigan State to advanced to the National Championship Game, which they were defeated by Virginia in overtime. With 31 wins, they finish with most wins in school history.

Offseason

Departures
On April 18, 2019 Jarrett Culver announced he would declare for the NBA draft and sign with an agent. On April 18, 2019 Khavon Moore entered his name in the NCAA transfer portal, then on May 16, 2019 announced his decision to transfer to Clemson. On May 11, 2019 Malik Ondigo entered his name in the NCAA transfer portal, then on June 17, 2019 announced his decision to transfer to Rice. On May 15, 2019 Josh Mballa entered his name in the NCAA transfer portal, then on June 7, 2019 announced he was transferring to Buffalo.

Incoming transfers
Texas Tech added three players, Chris Clarke, T. J. Holyfield, and Joel Ntwambe, as transfers. On May 11, 2019, T. J. Holyfield announced he was transferring in from Stephen F. Austin. On May 15, 2019 Chris Clarke announced he was transferring in from Virginia Tech. On May 26, 2019 Joel Ntwambe announced he was transferring in from UNLV.

2019 recruiting class

2020 Recruiting class

Roster

Schedule and results

|-
!colspan=12 style=|Regular season

|-
!colspan=12 style=| Big 12 Tournament
|- style="background:#bbbbbb"
| style="text-align:center"|Mar 12, 202011:30 am, ESPN2
| style="text-align:center"| (5)
| vs. (4) TexasQuarterfinals
| colspan=5 rowspan=1 style="text-align:center"|Cancelled due to the COVID-19 pandemic
| style="text-align:center"|Sprint CenterKansas City, MO

Rankings

*AP does not release post-NCAA tournament rankings.
No Coaches Poll for Week 1.

References

Texas Tech Red Raiders basketball seasons
Texas Tech
Texas Tech
Texas Tech